The Ministry of Finance  is the Botswana government ministry which formulates financial and economic policies and oversees effective coordination of Government financial operations. , the minister is Peggy Serame.

Current and previous Ministers 
Ministers of Finance of the Botswana since 1965:

See also 

 Government of Botswana
 Ministry of Transport and Communications

References

External links 

 Official website

Government ministries of Botswana
Finance ministries